Ukita (written: 浮田 or 宇喜多) is a Japanese surname. Notable people with the surname include:

, Japanese daimyō
, Japanese footballer
, Japanese aviation pioneer
, Japanese daimyō
, Japanese ice hockey player

Japanese-language surnames